The 1918–19 Centre Colonels men's basketball team represented Centre College during the 1918–19 college basketball season. The team featured Bo McMillin, Red Roberts, Edgar Diddle, and Matty Bell.

References

Centre
Centre Colonels men's basketball seasons